Basie Straight Ahead is an album recorded at TTG Studios, Hollywood, California in October 1968 featuring Count Basie and his orchestra. This album marked the first collaboration between Basie and his long-time orchestrator, Sammy Nestico, who composed, arranged and conducted all of the songs on the record. The engineers were Ami Hadani and Thorne Nogar, and the producers were Tom Mack and Teddy Reig. The disc was issued in 1968 on Dot label and on English EMI.

Track listing 
All tracks by Sammy Nestico

 "Basie - Straight Ahead" – 3:56
 "It's Oh, So Nice" – 4:10
 "Lonely Street" – 2:53
 "Fun Time" – 3:52
 "Magic Flea" – 3:09
 "Switch In Time" – 3:58
 "Hay Burner" – 4:16
 "That Warm Feeling" – 3:33
 "The Queen Bee" – 4:13

Personnel 
 Count Basie – piano, organ
 Sonny Cohn, Gene Coe, Oscar Brashear, Al Aarons – trumpet
 Grover Mitchell, Richard Boone, Bill Hughes, Steve Galloway – trombone
 Marshal Royal – alto saxophone
Bobby Plater – alto saxophone, flute
Eddie "Lockjaw" Davis – tenor saxophone
 Eric Dixon – tenor saxophone, flute
 Charlie Fowlkes – baritone saxophone
 Freddie Green – guitar
 Norman Keenan – double bass
 Harold Jones – drums
Sammy Nestico – piano (on "That Warm Feeling")

References

1968 albums
Count Basie Orchestra albums
Dot Records albums
Albums arranged by Sammy Nestico
Albums conducted by Sammy Nestico
Albums produced by Teddy Reig